Scullion is the first studio album by Irish band Scullion. It was released in 1979 by Mulligan Music and produced by P.J. Curtis.

Track listing

Personnel

Scullion
Sonny Condell — vocals, guitar, piano, saxophone, percussion
Greg Boland — vocals, guitar, percussion
Philip King — vocals, harmonica
Jimmy O'Brien-Moran — uilleann pipes, whistle, recorder

Additional musicians
Peter Browne — uilleann pipes on tracks 3, 4 and 10b, flute on "Domes" and "Cold River", whistle on "The Kilkenny Miners"
Kevin Burke — fiddle on "I Am Stretched On Your Grave"
John McAvoy — fiddle on "Living Blind" and "The Kilkenny Miners"
Mícheál Ó Domhnaill — harmonium
Tommy Hayes — bodhran, bones
Rita Connolly — vocals, backing vocals
Garvan Gallagher — double bass, drones
Robbie Brennan - drums

Production
Philip Begley – engineering
Paul Thomas, Steve Morris – engineering assistants
Andrew Boland – engineering on "Word About Colour" and "Fonn Mail"
Pat Musick – cover painting, sleeve design
Syd Bluett – sleeve design

Release history

1979 debut albums
Scullion (group) albums